The ALCO RSD-12 was a C-C diesel-electric locomotive rated at . 171 locomotives were produced —Used in much the same manner as its four-axle counterpart, the ALCO RS-11, though the six-motor design allowed better tractive effort at lower speeds.

Four examples survive today. NKP 329 is preserved as a museum display in Bellevue, OH. OERM 2954 (ex-SP 2954) and 2958 (ex-SP 2958) are preserved at OERM in Perris, California. Derelict LS&I 1804 rests in a shipyard in Escanaba, MI.

Original buyers

See also
List of ALCO diesel locomotives
 List of MLW diesel locomotives

References

 Komanesky, John et al. The Diesel Shop .  Retrieved July 3, 2008

External link

C-C locomotives
RSD-12
RSD-12
Diesel-electric locomotives of the United States
Railway locomotives introduced in 1956
Standard gauge locomotives of the United States
Standard gauge locomotives of Mexico
5 ft 3 in gauge locomotives